Silverdale Township is a township in Cowley County, Kansas, United States.  As of the 2000 census, its population was 327.

Geography
The streams of Grouse Creek, Otter Creek and Silver Creek run through this township.

Communities
The township contains the unincorporated community of Silverdale.

Cemeteries
According to the USGS, it contains two cemeteries: Liberty and Silverdale.

References

External links
 City-Data.com

Townships in Cowley County, Kansas
Townships in Kansas